Robert Jung (born 19 December 1944) is a German former football player and manager who played as a defender.

References

1944 births
Living people
German footballers
FK Pirmasens players
Association football defenders
2. Bundesliga players
German football managers
FK Pirmasens managers
FSV Salmrohr managers
Kickers Offenbach managers
1. FSV Mainz 05 managers
SV Wehen Wiesbaden managers
Wormatia Worms managers
FC 08 Homburg managers